Tikhomirovka is a rural locality (a selo) in Michurinskoye Rural Settlement, Kamyshinsky District, Volgograd Oblast, Russia. The population was 38 as of 2010.

Geography 
Tikhomirovka is located on the Volga Upland, on the right bank of the Ilovlya River, 31 km north of Kamyshin (the district's administrative centre) by road. Umet is the nearest rural locality.

References 

Rural localities in Kamyshinsky District